Sporting Clube de Macau is a Macanese professional football club that competes in the Liga de Elite. It was founded in 1926 as the former branch of Sporting Clube de Portugal.

History

Beginnings
The Macau Sporting Club was founded on 22 September 1926 as the No.25 branch of Sporting Clube de Portugal. It began under the  direction of Henrique Nolasco da Silva (President), Francisco Borralho (secretary), Angelo Rosary (treasurer), and alternates Dr. Horacio Carvalho, Pedro Pereira Leite, and Mário Ribeiro.

Among its past Presidents, there were athletes such as António Conceição, the first Macanese athlete to become Portuguese National Champion of 5x80 meters velocity relay races in 1928 and 1930.

He would return to Macau in the late 1930s and would be Macau team coach and in 1951 become President of the club.
In this position, he would send Augusto Rocha and Joaquim Pacheco to his beloved Sporting, where they would be selected for the Portugal national football team.

Golden Era

The Macau Sporting Club was reactivated a second time in 1951 after a certain period of erasure, by António Conceição, Adelino Serra, Major Acacio Cabrera Henriques, and Mario Abreu, among others.

In the 1960s Eduardo Atraca played for Sporting Clube de Macau and in the 1980s he would become the President of the club. Sporting became champion of Macau during this time.

In the 1990s it was the turn of Fernando Lopes to be President of Sporting Clube de Macau leading the team to become champion of Macau once again.

The Macau Sporting Club had in the 80s, when the club was chaired by Eduardo Atraca, a great football team. It was this club that reached the Sporting players like Rock .
Club members, including two of reactivating the Macau Sporting Club in 1951 and two presidents of the club, and the son of António Conceição, António Conceição Júnior.

After that, the vicissitudes of life led to the club once again to stay asleep for more than 20 years.

Reactivation

On 4 June 2008, António Conceição Júnior set the challenge of reviving the Branch no. # 25 of Sporting Clube de Portugal, as a way to honor the memory of his father, António Conceição Sr.

One of the first projects undertaken was the identification of Sportinguistas the territory of Macao Special Administrative Region and. Working at cruising speed, on 25 November 2008 a historic Extraordinary General Meeting was held, as this was a truly important step in reactivation of the branch, where it proceeded to the admission of new partners and marking of elections to the governing bodies.

On 15 February 2009 elections were finally held, in which 40 of the 54 members voted with electoral capacity. In 2009 Sporting was once more reactivated and counts with more than 100 members. The President since 2009 has been António Conceição Júnior.

On 5 June 2009, almost a year after the launch of the challenge of reviving the club, there was a new General Assembly for approval of new statutes, since the last one dated from 10 March 1951. Subsequently, the Articles were published in the Official Gazette, thus allowing, for their formalization, registration of the Club at the Institute of Sport and the championship of the Macau Football Association.

In just one year, the vision of António Conceição Júnior became a reality. The work done by you and your peers are evidence of a large Sporting spirit, living up to the words of John F. Kennedy: "Ask not what your country (club) can do for you before you question what you can do for your country (club) ".

The club suffered a boost with the creation of a team that premiered on 19 August 2009 in the championship of the 2nd Division of football. It was called football seven, and was played with a number 4 ball - ranking for which all new teams enter and were attended by 92 clubs and 18 groups. Paul Conde and Mandinho offered their services to help the club of their heart.

In November 2010, Agostinho Caetano became the coach.

In December 2011, the club achieved promotion to the 2nd Division Football Macau, to clinch the runner-up in Division 3.

In 2013, the club achieved promotion to Division 1 of Macau Football, the Liga de Elite. The club was preparing for the 2nd Division, but the withdrawal of another club gave them the rise to the top flight.

Board of Directors 

 President: TBA
 Vice-President: TBA
 Director of Football: TBA
 Treasurer: TBA

Honours
Liga de Elite
 Champions: 1950, 1962, 1963, 1991
 Runners-up: 2014
2nd Division
 Champions: 2013
Taça de Macau em Futebol
 Champions: 1951

Current squad
Squad for the 2020 Liga de Elite

Staff

Partnership
On 2 September 2014, Sporting Clube de Macau announced a partnership with FC Osaka, which makes the transfer of players between Macau and Japan possible.

References

External links
Official Website

Football clubs in Macau